Roshan Mau is a town in Kanpur Dehat district in the state of Uttar Pradesh, India.

It is situated on the left banks of Rindh river and is located in Akbarpur tehsil. Ambedkar park/ BUDDHA park is most famous place in village.

Demographics
 India census, Roshan Mau had a population of 1,828. Males constitute 54% of the population and females 46%.

Geography

Cities and towns in Kanpur Dehat district